Melrose Place, a primetime soap opera created by Darren Star, premiered on July 8, 1992 on Fox network in the United States and ended on May 24, 1999. The show spans seven seasons of 226 episodes, and one special aired in 1995. Each episode was approximately 45 minutes long (without commercials) though there were several double or two-part episodes that were shown as feature length 85 to 90 minute episodes

The complete series of Melrose Place has been released on DVD in the United States (Region 1) from 2006 to 2012, the final season having been released on July 31, 2012.

Series overview

Episodes

Season 1 (1992–93)

Season 2 (1993–94)

Season 3 (1994–95)

Season 4 (1995–96)

Season 5 (1996–97)

Season 6 (1997–98)

Season 7 (1998–99)

References

External links
 

Beverly Hills, 90210 (franchise)
Lists of American drama television series episodes